Amore mio (Italian "my love") may refer to:

Music

Albums
 Amore Mio (Thalía album), 2014

Songs
 "Amore Mio" (song), by Thalía from Amore Mio, 2015
 "Amore Mio", song by Andreas Martin, 1982
 "Amore mio", song by Daniele Silvestri, 1999
 "Amore Mio", song by Gene Pitney,	1966
 "Amore mio", song by Mina from Del mio meglio n. 3, 1975
 "Amore mio", song by Paola e Chiara, 1997
 "Amore mio", song by Sergio Franchi, 1959
 "Amore Mio", song by Winifred Atwell, 1959
 "Amore mio/Quando parlo con te", song by Umberto Balsamo, 1973
 "Amore mio/Senso vietato", song by Enzo Malepasso, 1981

See also
Amore (disambiguation)
Amor mío (disambiguation)